D.260 is a  long west–east state road running eastwards from Afyonkarahisar in the Aegean Region through Central Anatolia Region to Erzurum, in the Eastern Anatolia Region.

References

External links

260
Transport in Afyonkarahisar Province
Transport in Eskişehir Province
Transport in Ankara Province
Transport in Kırıkkale Province
Transport in Kırşehir Province
Transport in Kayseri Province
Transport in Sivas Province
Transport in Malatya Province
Transport in Elazığ Province
Transport in Erzurum Province